Sulejman Kupusović (7 April 1951 – 15 August 2014) was a Bosnian theater director. Also, he directed some television films and series.

In 1974, Kupusović received a diploma from the Academy of Theatre and Film Arts in Zagreb, as a director of theater, film and television. He later studied philosophy and comparative literature at the University of Zagreb. He directed in theaters across the former Yugoslavia, as well as the first Bosnian opera, Hasanaginica, which premiered in Sarajevo on 18 March 2000. In addition to theater performances, he has directed several TV films, dramas and sitcoms. He directed the award-winning 2011 theater play Krokodil Lacoste written by Zlatko Topčić, in Chamber Theater 55.

Kupusović died aged 63 in the Bosnian capital city after a long illness. After his death, the stages of the Sarajevo National Theatre where Kupusović directed a number of plays were covered with white roses. The memorial began with the John Lennon song Working Class Hero as Kupusović's paintings were shown on screen.

Filmography

References

External links

1951 births
2014 deaths
People from Kladanj
Yugoslav film directors
Bosnia and Herzegovina film directors